James A. Luisi (November 2, 1928 – June 7, 2002) was an American professional basketball player and actor. Luisi is perhaps best known for his role as Lt. Doug Chapman, the apoplectic foil to detective Jim Rockford, in a total of 23 episodes during Seasons 3 through 6 of the television series The Rockford Files.

Basketball career
Born in East Harlem, New York City, Luisi attended St. Francis College on a basketball scholarship before being drafted by the Boston Celtics in the sixth round of the 1951 NBA draft. After serving in the US Army during the Korean War, he played with the Baltimore Bullets for one year in the 1953–54 season. At 6'2" (1.88 m) and 180 lb (82 kg), he played guard for 31 games and averaged 3 points a game.

Stage
Luisi then attended the American Academy of Dramatic Arts, and appeared on Broadway in productions of Alfie and Do I Hear a Waltz? as well as the original 1966 production of Sweet Charity.

Television and movies
From 1961 to the mid-1970s Luisi appeared on such television shows as Naked City, The Rifleman, The Doctors (5 episodes), Bonanza (2 episodes), The F.B.I. (2 different roles in 2 episodes), Adam-12,  Kojak (2 roles in a total of 3 episodes), Cannon, Police Story (2 roles in a total of 3 episodes), The Rookies (2 roles in 2 episodes), Mannix (2 roles in 2 episodes), Ironside, Barnaby Jones (5 roles in 5 episodes), The Streets of San Francisco, Gunsmoke (2 episodes), Hawkins, Vega$, Chopper One and S.W.A.T.

In  1976 Luisi had a guest role as a shady businessman on a Season 2 episode of The Rockford Files. The next season on the same show he portrayed Lt. Doug Chapman, a high-ranking, disagreeable police officer who dislikes the titular Rockford character portrayed by James Garner. Luisi ultimately played Chapman in 23 episodes, until the end of the show's six-year run. He reprised the role in two Rockford TV-movies in 1996.

In 1976, Luisi shared a Daytime Emmy Award for Outstanding Actor in a Daytime Drama Special for his portrayal of George Washington in the 1975 miniseries First Ladies Diaries: Martha Washington.

Also in 1976 he appeared on The Mary Tyler Moore Show episode titled “Sue Ann Falls In Love”. He subsequently had guest roles in Starsky and Hutch, Black Sheep Squadron, Hunter (2 episodes), Wonder Woman, Fantasy Island, Quincy M.E. and Buck Rogers in the 25th Century.

During the 1980s Luisi guest starred on such television staples as CHiPs, Vega$, Hart to Hart (in 2 episodes), The A-Team, Knight Rider, T. J. Hooker, Matt Houston, The Fall Guy, Simon & Simon, Magnum, P.I., Knots Landing (the same role in 4 episodes) and It's a Living.  In 1987 and 1988 he appeared as Ben Clark in 23 episodes of the soap opera Santa Barbara. From 1987 to 1992 he appeared as Duke Earl Johnson in 21 episodes of Days of Our Lives.

Luisi appeared in the studio films Ben (1972), I Escaped from Devil's Island (1973), The Man from Independence (1974), The Take (1974), Stunts (1977), Killer's Delight (1978), Moment by Moment (1978), Norma Rae (1979), Fade to Black (1980), Star 80 (1983), Murphy's Law (1986), The Hidden (1987), Feds (1987), Lethal Woman (1987) and Wanted (1998).

He also appeared in the made-for-television movies Cat Ballou (1971), Cry Rape (1973), Honky Tonk (1974), Don't Call Us (1976), The Cabot Connection (1977), A Love Affair: The Eleanor and Lou Gehrig Story (1977), Contract on Cherry Street  (1977), Love Is Not Enough (1978), One in a Million: The Ron LeFlore Story (1978), The Asphalt Cowboy (1980), Our Family Business (1981), The Renegades (1982), Sunset Limousine (1983) and The Red-Light Sting (1984).

Death
Luisi died of cancer in 2002, aged 73. He was survived by his wife of 41 years, the former Georgia Phillips. He was also survived by his daughter, Jamie Swartz; a brother, Jerry Luisi; and two grandchildren. He is buried in Los Angeles at Pierce Brothers Valhalla Memorial Park.

Filmography (partial)

References

External links
 
NBA statistics at basketball-reference.com
 

1928 births
2002 deaths
Male actors from New York City
American Academy of Dramatic Arts alumni
American male film actors
American male stage actors
American male television actors
American men's basketball players
Baltimore Bullets (1944–1954) players
Basketball players from New York City
Boston Celtics draft picks
Burials at Valhalla Memorial Park Cemetery
Deaths from cancer in California
People from East Harlem
Point guards
St. Francis Brooklyn Terriers men's basketball players
Shooting guards
Sportspeople from Manhattan
20th-century American male actors